Madis Käbin (25 March 1877 Kohtla Parish (now Toila Parish), Kreis Wierland – 24 October 1954 Tallinn) was an Estonian politician. He was a member of Estonian Constituent Assembly, representing the Estonian Labour Party. He was a member of the assembly since 17 March 1920. He replaced Eduard Kansman.

References

1877 births
1954 deaths
People from Toila Parish
People from Kreis Wierland
Estonian Labour Party politicians
Members of the Estonian Constituent Assembly